Klaus Weese (born 20 November 1967) is a German former freestyle skier. He competed at the 1992 Winter Olympics and the 1994 Winter Olympics.

References

External links
 

1967 births
Living people
German male freestyle skiers
Olympic freestyle skiers of Germany
Freestyle skiers at the 1992 Winter Olympics
Freestyle skiers at the 1994 Winter Olympics
People from Wiesloch
Sportspeople from Karlsruhe (region)
20th-century German people